Miss International 1976, the 16th Miss International pageant, was held on July 2, 1976 at the Imperial Garden Theater in Tokyo, Japan. Lidija Manić of Yugoslavia crowned her successor Sophie Perin of France. This is France's first ever Miss International crown.

Results

Placements

Contestants
44 Contestants has competed the title this year.

  - Johanna Fonseca
  - Patrice Lesley Newell
  - Elvira Botempo
  - Beatrice Libert
  - Martha Rosa Baeza
  - Vionete Revoredo Fonseca
  - Janet Withey
  - Lynn Hore
  - Maria Antonieta Rosselló
  - Alicia Sáenz Madrid
  - Maritza Elizabeth Ortiz Calvo
  - Maarit Hannele Leso
  - Sophie Perin
  - Paula Bergner
  - Maria Sinanidou
  - Thelma Zenaida Hechanova
  - Debbie Lee
  - Cornelia "Cora" Yvonne Kitz
  - Victoria Ann Baker
  - Margaret Tsui Mei-Ling
  - Sigrun Saevarsdóttir
  - Nafisa Ali
  - Treesye Ratri Astuti
  - Dorit Cohen
  - Joanna Avana
  - Kumie Nakamura
  - Han Young-ae
  - Carmen Pick
  - Fauziah Haron
  - Alejandra Mora Urbina
  - Maria Fiallos Castellón
  - Maria Dolores "Dolly" Suarez Ascalon
  - Yvonne Torres García
  - Sandra Jane Binny
  - Victoria Martín González
  - Sudhaama Kitchilan
  - Marie Gunilla Borhäll
  - Beatrice Aschwanden
  - Patricia Mareva Servonnat
  - Duangratana Thaweechokesubin
  - Isabel Ana Ferrero
  - Susan Elizabeth Carlson
  - Iris Betsabé Ayala Morillo
  - Tulia Nirskha Marcic

Notes

Designations
  - Due to her mother's illness, Rania Theofilou (World '76) cancelled her participation and was replaced by Maria Sinanidou.

References

1976
1976 beauty pageants
Beauty pageants in Japan
1976 in Tokyo